Harve Brosten (born May 15, 1943, in Chicago, Illinois) is an American Emmy Award-winning screenwriter for television. Brosten is best known for working on All in the Family, a sitcom from the mid-1970s.

Credits
All in the Family (TV series) 1975-1977
The Jeffersons (TV series) 1975
Romance, Romance (produced for the Broadway stage by) 
Shamus (assistant to director, assistant to producer) 1973
The Anderson Tapes (assistant to producer) 1971

Awards and nominations
1978: Won the Primetime Emmy Award for Outstanding Writing for a Comedy Series, with Bob Weiskopf, Barry Michael Harman, and Bob Schiller, for All in the Family
1988: Nominated for the Tony Award for Best Musical for Romance/Romance, with Dasha Epstein and Jay S. Bulmash

References

External links

1943 births
Emmy Award winners
Living people
American television writers
American male television writers
Writers from Chicago
Screenwriters from Illinois